Większyce  (German: Wiegschütz) is a village in the administrative district of Gmina Reńska Wieś, within Kędzierzyn-Koźle County, Opole Voivodeship, in south-western Poland. Większyce / Wiegschütz is bilingual: German and Polish. It is officially called in both languages.

References

Villages in Kędzierzyn-Koźle County